Dominica competed at the 2004 Summer Olympics in Athens, Greece, from 13 to 29 August 2004. The country's participation at Athens marked its third appearance in the Summer Olympics since its debut in the 1996 Summer Olympics. Two track and field athletes, Chris Lloyd and Marie-Lyne Joseph were selected to represent the nation, the latter by a wildcard place as the nation had no other athletes that met either the "A" or "B" qualifying standards apart from Lloyd. Lloyd was selected as flag bearer for the opening ceremony.

Athletics 

Dominican athletes have so far achieved qualifying standards in the following athletics events (up to a maximum of 3 athletes in each event at the 'A' Standard, and 1 at the 'B' Standard).

Key
Note–Ranks given for track events are within the athlete's heat only
Q = Qualified for the next round
q = Qualified for the next round as a fastest loser or, in field events, by position without achieving the qualifying target
NR = National record
N/A = Round not applicable for the event
Bye = Athlete not required to compete in round

Men

Women

See also
Dominica at the 2003 Pan American Games

References

External links
Official Report of the XXVIII Olympiad

Nations at the 2004 Summer Olympics
2004
Olympics